Khaled Abdulrahman Ahmed Al Raqi Al Amoudi (born 10 September 1988) is an Emirati former professional footballer. He is the brother of footballers Mohamed Abdulrahman and Omar Abdulrahman.

References

External links
 

Emirati footballers
Al Ain FC players
Emirati people of Yemeni descent
1988 births
Living people
UAE Pro League players
Naturalized citizens of the United Arab Emirates
Association football fullbacks